Sound Ray is an album by pianist Ray Bryant recorded and released by Cadet Records in 1969.

Track listing 
All compositions by Ray Bryant except where noted
 "A Song for My Father" (Horace Silver) – 5:23
 "Con Alma" (Dizzy Gillespie) – 4:14
 "Scarborough Fair" (Simon H Garfunkel) – 4:36
 "Stick With It" – 5:09
 "Broadway" (Billy Bird, Henri Woode, Teddy McRae) – 5:30
 "Li'l Darlin'" (Neal Hefti) – 5:09
 "The Look of Love" (Burt Bacharach, Hal David) – 5:30
 "Sound Ray" (Bryant, Richard Evans) – 3:40

Personnel 
Ray Bryant – piano
Jimmy Rowser – bass
Freddie Waits – drums

References 

1969 albums
Ray Bryant albums
Cadet Records albums